Everis Anson Hayes (March 10, 1855 – June 3, 1942) was an American lawyer and politician who served seven terms as a U.S. Representative from California from 1905 to 1919.

Biography 
Born in Waterloo, Wisconsin, Hayes attended the public schools. He was graduated from the Waterloo High School in 1873 and from the literary and law departments of the University of Wisconsin–Madison in 1879. He was admitted to the bar in 1879 and commenced practice in Madison, Wisconsin. He moved to Ashland, Wisconsin, in 1883 and in 1886 to Hurley, Wisconsin, and continued the practice of his profession. He moved to Ironwood, Michigan, in 1886 and engaged in the mining of ore. He moved to San Jose, California, in 1887 and engaged in fruit raising and mining. With his brother, Jay Orley Hayes, he purchased the San Jose Mercury in 1900 and the San Jose Herald the following year, becoming publisher and proprietor of the two papers.

Congress 
Hayes defeated incumbent Democratic congressman William J. Wynn and was elected as a Republican to the Fifty-ninth and to the six succeeding Congresses (March 4, 1905 – March 3, 1919). He was an outspoken anti-Japanese nativist. On April 5, 1917, he was one of the 50 representatives who voted against declaring war on Germany.  He was an unsuccessful candidate for reelection in 1918 to the Sixty-sixth Congress. He resumed his newspaper activities in San Jose, with mining interests in Ironwood, Michigan, and Sierra City, California.

Death 
He died in San Jose, June 3, 1942. He was interred in Oak Hill Memorial Park Cemetery.

References

External links

1855 births
1942 deaths
People from Waterloo, Wisconsin
University of Wisconsin–Madison alumni
University of Wisconsin Law School alumni
Republican Party members of the United States House of Representatives from California
Editors of California newspapers
Wisconsin lawyers
Burials at Oak Hill Memorial Park
The Mercury News people
20th-century American newspaper publishers (people)